Also known as anime-based games, this is a list of computer and video games that are based on manga or anime properties. The list does not include games based on western cartoons, which are separately listed at List of video games based on cartoons.

#

A
 Aah! Harimanada (Game Boy, Game Gear, Mega Drive)
 Accel World: Ginyoku no Kakusei (PlayStation 3, PlayStation Portable, 2012)
 Accel World: Kasoku no Chōten (PlayStation 3, PlayStation Portable, 2013)
 Ace wo Nerae! (Super Famicom, Telenet Japan, December 24, 1993, ¥9400, Tennis)
 Ah! My Goddess! (PC-FX, NEC, December 29, 1993, ¥8000, Adventure)
 Quiz Ah! My Goddess!: Tatakau Tsubasa to Tomo ni (Arcade, Sega/Wow Entertainment Inc./Kodansha, May 2000, Adventure/Quiz)
 Quiz Ah! My Goddess!: Tatakau Tsbasa to Tomo ni (Dreamcast, Sega/Wow Entertainment Inc./Kodansha, November 20, 2000, ¥5800/¥8800, Adventure)
 Akazukin Chacha (Game Boy, Tomy, 1995)
 Akazukin ChaCha (Super Famicom, Tomy, 1996, Role-playing)
 Akazukin ChaCha: Osawagase! Panic Race! (PC-FX, NEC, October 25, 1996, ¥7800, Board)
 Akira (Famicom, ¥6800, Role-playing)
 Akira (CD-32, AMI)
 Akira Psycho Ball (PlayStation 2, 2006)
 Akuma-kun: Makai no Wana (Family Computer)
 Angelic Layer (Game Boy Advance)
 Anpanman (Nintendo DS, Wii, Famicom, PlayStation, Sega Pico, Advanced Pico Beena）
 Ao no Exorcist: Genkoku no Labyrinth (PlayStation Portable, 2012, Visual novel)
 Ao no Exorcist: Weekend Hero (PlayStation Portable)
 Aoi Blink (PC Engine)
 Appleseed EX (PlayStation 2)
 Appleseed: Prometheus no Shintaku (Super Famicon)
 Araiguma Rascal: Raccoon Rascal (Super Famicom)
 Area 88 (Arcade, Capcom, August 1989, Shooting, titled U.N. Squadron in North America)
 Area 88 (Super Famicom, Capcom, July 26, 1991, ¥8500, Shooting, titled U.N. Squadron in North America)
 Armored Police Metal Jack (Game Boy, Super Famicom)
 Armored Trooper Votoms (Various consoles)
 Armored Trooper Votoms Gaiden: Blue Knight Berserga Story (PlayStation, Takara, October 30, 1997, ¥9800/¥5800, 3D fighting)
 Armored Troopers Votoms: Woodo.Kummen (PlayStation, Takara, April 2, 1998, ¥9800/¥5800, 3D action)
 Armored Trooper Votoms: Lightning Slash (PlayStation, Takara, March 18, 1999, ¥9800/¥5800, 3D action)
 Armored Troopers Votoms: Steel Force (PlayStation, Takara, September 30, 1999, ¥6800, Strategy)
 Ashita no Joe (Super Famicom, Kei Amuzement, November 27, 1992, ¥8900, Boxing)
 Ashita no Joe no Densetsu (NeoGeo, Boxing)
 Ashita no Nadja (Sega Pico)
 Astro Boy
 Astro Boy: Omega Factor (Game Boy Advance, Sega,  December 18, 2003)
 Astro Boy (PlayStation 2, Sega, April 18, 2004)
 Attack on Titan (PC, PlayStation 3, PlayStation 4, PlayStation Vita, Xbox One)
 Attack on Titan: Humanity in Chains (Nintendo 3DS)
 Attack on Titan Tribute Game (PC)
Attack on Titan 2 (PC,Playstation 4,Xbox One, Nintendo Switch)
 Aura Battler Dunbine (MSX, PlayStation)

B
 Bakemonogatari Portable (PlayStation Portable, 2012, Visual Novel)
 Bakugan Battle Brawlers (video game) (PlayStation 2, Xbox 360, Wii, Nintendo DS, PlayStation Portable)
 Bakuretsu Hunter (Sega Saturn, I'Max, April 26, 1996, ¥8800, Adventure)
 Bakuretsu Hunter Mahjongg Special (PlayStation, Banpresto, October 25, 1996, ¥5800, Mahjongg)
 Bakuretsu Hunter: Sorezore no Omoi...Nowānchatte (PlayStation, Banpresto, April 11, 1997, ¥5800, Adventure)
 Bakuretsu Hunter R (Sega Saturn, King Records, August 8, 1997, ¥5800, Adventure)
 Bastard! Ankoku no Hakaishin (Super Famicom, Cobra Team, 1994, 3D FIghting/Action)
 Bastard! (PlayStation, Seta/Shueisha, December 27, 1996, ¥6800, Role-playing)
 Battle B-Daman (Game Boy, Game Boy Advance, Nintendo 64, Super Famicom)
 Battle Mages Free (Android Mobile)
 Beck: The Game (PS2)
 Berserk: Millennium Falcon Hen Seima Senki no Shō (PlayStation 2, Sega-Sammy, October 2004, 3D Action/Adventure)
 Berserk and the Band of the Hawk (PlayStation 3, PlayStation 4, October 2016, Musou)
 Berserk: Sword of the Berserk: Guts' Rage (Dreamcast, Yuke's/ASCII, December 1999, 3D Action/Adventure)
 Beyblade
 Bikkuriman World (PC Engine, Hudson, October 30, 1987, ¥4500, Action)
 Bikkuriman Daijikai (PC Engine, Hudson, December 23, 1988, ¥4980, Quiz)
 Bikkuriman World Gekitō Seisenshi (Famicom, Hudson, July 27, 1990, ¥6800, Role-playing)
 Super Bikkuriman (Super Famicom, Interbec, January 29, 1993, ¥8190, Fighting/Action)
 Bikkuriman 2000 Viva! Festiva! (Dreamcast, Sega Toys, May 2, 2000, ¥4800, Minigames)
 Bikkuriman 2000 Viva! Pocket Festiva! (Neo Geo Pocket Color, Sega Toys, March 16, 2000, ¥3800, Minigame)
 Bikkuriman 2000 Viva! Festiva! (Game Boy Color, Imagineer, June 10, 2000, ¥3980, Card)
 Bikkuriman 2000 Viva! Festiva! (Dreamcast, Sega Toys, May 2, 2000, ¥4800, Boardgame)
 Bishoujo Senshi Sailor Moon (PC Engine, Super Famicom, Mega Drive, Game Boy, Sega Pico)
 Black Cat (PlayStation 2)
 Black Clover: Dream Knights (Android)
 Black Clover: Quartet Knights (PlayStation 4, PC, 2018)
 Black Rock Shooter: The Game (PlayStation Portable)
 Bleach: The 3rd Phantom Nintendo DS}
 Bleach: Blade Battlers (PlayStation 2)
 Bleach: Blade Battlers 2nd (PlayStation 2)
 Bleach: The Blade of Fate (Nintendo DS October 9, 2007; Europe February, 2008)
 Bleach GC (Nintendo GameCube)
 Bleach: Heat the Soul (PlayStation Portable)
 Bleach: Heat the Soul 2 (PlayStation Portable)
 Bleach: Heat the Soul 3 (PlayStation Portable)
 Bleach: Heat the Soul 4 (PlayStation Portable)
 Bleach: Heat the Soul 5 (PlayStation Portable)
 Bleach: Heat the Soul 6 (PlayStation Portable)
 Bleach: Heat the Soul 7 (PlayStation Portable)
 Bleach: Shattered Blade (Wii, Release Date(s): JPN December 14, 2006; North America)
 Bleach: Soul Carnival (PlayStation Portable)
 Bleach: Soul Carnival 2 (PlayStation Portable)
 Bleach: Soul Resurrección (PS3)
 Blood+: The final piece (PlayStation Portable, 2006, Adventure RPG)
 Blood The Last Vampire (PlayStation 2, 2006)
 Blood+: One Night Kiss (PlayStation 2, 2006, Action Shooter)
 Blood+: Sōyoku no Battle Rondo (PlayStation 2, 2006, Adventure Game)
 Blue Seed: Kushinada-hime Hirokuden (Saturn, Sega, June 23, 1995, ¥5800, Role-playing)
 Boboboubo Boubobo (PlayStation 2)
 Boboboubo Boubobo: 9 Kiwame Senshi Gyagu Yuugou (Game Boy Advance)
 Boboboubo Boubobo: Bakutou Hajike Taisen (Game Boy Advance)
 Boboboubo Boubobo Dassutsu! Hajike Royale (Nintendo Gamecube)
 Boboboubo Boubobo: Majide!!? Shinken Shoubu (Game Boy Advance)
 Boboboubo Boubobo: Ougi 87.5 Bakuretsu Hanage Shinken (Game Boy Advance)
 Boboboubo Boubobo: Shuumare! Taikan Boubobo: (PlayStation 2)
 Boku no Hero Academia: Battle For All (Nintendo 3DS, 2016)
 Boku no Hero Academia: One's Justice (PlayStation 4, Xbox One, Nintendo Switch, PC, 2018)
 Bouken ou Beet: Darkness Century (PlayStation 2)
 Boys Be... (PlayStation, PlayStation 2)
 Brave Fencer Musashi (PlayStation)
 Brave Story: New Traveler (PlayStation Portable, 2006, RPG)
 Bravoman (Arcade, Namco, 1998)
 Chōzetsu Rinjin Bravoman (PC Engine, Namco, ¥6800, 1998)
 Bubblegum Crash!  (PC Engine, Naxat, December 6, 1991, ¥7200, Adventure)
 Busou Renkin: Welcome To Papillion Park (PlayStation 2)

C
 Captain Tsubasa (Famicom, Super Famicom, Game Boy, Game Boy Advance, Sega-CD, PlayStation, PlayStation 2, Nintendo Gamecube, PlayStation Portable)
 Cardcaptor Sakura (PlayStation, Game Boy Color, Sega Dreamcast, Game Boy Advance, Wonderswan)
 Chibi Maruko-chan (Famicom, Sega Pico, Super Famicom, Game Boy, Game Boy Color, Mega Drive, Neo Geo, Sega Saturn, PlayStation, Nintendo DS)
 Chobits (Game Boy Advance. PlayStation 2)
 Cobra (see List of Cobra video games)
 Code Geass Hangyaku no Lelouch (Nintendo DS)
 Code Geass - Hangyaku no Lelouch R2 - Banjou no Geass Gekijou (Nintendo DS)
 Code Geass: Lost Colors (PlayStation Portable, PlayStation 2)
Cowboy Bebop (PlayStation)
Cowboy Bebop (PlayStation 2)
 Crayon Shin-chan (Famicom, Sega Pico, Super Famicom, Game Boy Advance, Nintendo DS, Wii)
 Crusher Joe (PC-9801)
 Cutie Honey Flash (Sega Pico)
 Cyborg 009 (Sega-CD, Super Famicom, PlayStation)
 Cyborg Kuro-chan (Game Boy Color)

D
 D.Gray-man: Kami no Shitotachi (Nintendo DS)
 D.Gray-man Sōsha no Shikaku (PlayStation 2)
 D.N. Angel: Crimson Wings (PlayStation 2)
 Dengeki Bunko Fighting Climax (PlayStation 3, PlayStation Vita)
 Dengeki Bunko Fighting Climax Ignition (PlayStation 3, PlayStation 4, PlayStation Vita)
 Death Connection (PlayStation Portable)
 Death Note Kira Game (Nintendo DS)
 Death Note L o Tsugumono (Nintendo DS)
 L the Prologue to Death Note -Rasen no Wana- (Nintendo DS)
 Detective Conan (game list)
Detective Pikachu
 Demon Beast Invasion (PC98)
Demon Slayer: Kimetsu no Yaiba – The Hinokami Chronicles (Microsoft Windows, PlayStation 4, PlayStation 5, Xbox One, Xbox Series X/S)
 Detonator Orgun (Mega CD)
 Devastator (Mega CD)
 Devil Hunter Yoko (Mega Drive)
 Devilman (PlayStation)
 Di Gi Charat Fantasy (Dreamcast visual novel game based on Di Gi Charat)
 Digimon (PlayStation, PlayStation Portable, PlayStation 2, Nintendo DS, Game Boy Advance, Gamecube, Sega Saturn, WonderSwan, WonderSwan Color, Xbox)
 Dinosaur King (Nintendo DS)
 Dirty Pair (Famicom Disk System)
 Doraemon (PC Engine, Famicom, Sega Pico, Super Famicom, Mega Drive, Game Boy Color)
 Dragon Ball (see List of Dragon Ball video games)
 Dragonia
 Duel Masters (see the list of video games)
 Durarara!! 3 Way Stand Off (PlayStation Portable game based on Durarara!!; Japan only)
 Doki Doki! Pretty Cure Narikiri Life! (Nintendo 3DS)

E
 El Hazard: Shinpi no Sekai (Sega Saturn)
 Erementar Gerad (PlayStation 2)
 Eureka Seven vol. 1: The New Wave (PlayStation 2)
 Eureka Seven vol. 2: The New Vision (PlayStation 2)
 Eyeshield 21: MAX Devil Power (Nintendo DS)

F
 Fairy Tail: Portable Guild (PlayStation Portable)
 Fairy Tail: Portable Guild 2 (PlayStation Portable)
 Fairy Tail: Zeref Awakens (PlayStation Portable)
 Fairy Tail: Fight! Wizard Battle (Nintendo DS)
 Fairy Tail: Attack! Kardia Cathedral (Nintendo DS)
 Fate/extra (PlayStation Portable)
 Fate/unlimited codes (PlayStation Portable, PS2, arcade)
 Final Approach (PlayStation 2)
 Fist of the North Star (see List of Fist of the North Star video games)
 Fullmetal Alchemist 2: Curse of the Crimson Elixir (PlayStation 2)
 Fullmetal Alchemist 3: Kami o Tsugu Shōjo (PlayStation 2)
 Fullmetal Alchemist and the Broken Angel (PlayStation 2)
 Fullmetal Alchemist: Dual Sympathy (Nintendo DS)
 Fullmetal Alchemist: Senaka wo Takuseshi Mono (PlayStation Portable)
 Fullmetal Alchemist: Daughter of the Dusk (Wii)
 Fullmetal Alchemist: Yakusoku no Hi e (PlayStation Portable)
 Fushigi no Umi no Nadia (Family Computer, Mega Drive, PC Engine, FM Towns, PC-98, Sharp X68000, PlayStation 2)
 Futari wa Precure (Game Boy Advance)
 Future GPX Cyber Formula (Game Boy, Super Famicom, PlayStation, PC, PlayStation 2, GameCube, PlayStation Portable)
 Fushigi Yugi (Nintendo DS, PlayStation 2, PlayStation Portable)
 Futari wa Pretty Cure: Arienai! Yume no Sono wa Daimeikyu (Game Boy Advance)
 Futari wa Pretty Cure (Sega Pico)
 Futari wa Pretty Cure Max Heart - DANZEN! DS de Pretty Cure Chikara wo Awasete Dai Battle!! (Nintendo DS)
 Futari Wa Pretty Cure Max Heart: Maji? Maji!? Fight de IN Janai (Game Boy Advance)
 Futari Wa Pretty Cure Splash Star - Panpaka Game De Zekkouchou! (Nintendo DS)
 Fresh Pretty Cure! Asobi Collection (Nintendo DS)

G
 Game ni Natta yo! Dokuro-chan ~ Kenkou Shindan Daisakusen
 Gantz: The Game (PlayStation 2)
 Gate Keepers (PlayStation)
 GD Leen (Super Famicom)
 GeGeGe no Kitaro (Sega Pico, PlayStation, DS,　Game Boy Advance, Super Famicom, Famicom, Wii, Game Boy)
 Get Backers: The Stolen City of Infinite (PlayStation 2)
 Get Backers Dakkanoku: Dakkandayo! Zenin Shuugou!! (PlayStation 2)
 Get Backers Dakkanoku: Ura Shinjuku Saikyou Battle (PlayStation 2)
 Ghost in the Shell (based on Ghost in the Shell; PlayStation)
 Ghost in the Shell: Stand Alone Complex (based on Stand Alone Complex; PlayStation 2, PlayStation Portable)
 Ghost Sweeper Mikami (Super Famicom, PC Engine)
 Gintama Dīesu Yorozuya Daisōdō! (Nintendo DS)
 Gintama Gintama Kuesuto Gin-san ga Tenshoku-shitari Sekai o Sukuttari (Nintendo DS)
 Gintama Gintoki vs Hijikata!? Kabuki-cho Gintama Daisōdatsusen!! (Nintendo DS)
 GioGio's Bizarre Adventure (PS2)
 Girlfriend of Steel (based on Neon Genesis Evangelion; Sega Saturn, PlayStation)
 Girlfriend of Steel 2 (based on Neon Genesis Evangelion)
 Girls und Panzer: Senshadō, Kiwamemasu! (PS Vita)
 Goldfish Warning! (Game Boy, Super Famicom)
 Golgo 13: Top Secret Episode (NES, Vic Tokai, 1988)
 Golgo 13 II: The Mafat Conspiracy (NES, Vic Tokai, 1990)
 Gon (Super Famicom)
 Gon: Baku Baku Baku Baku Adventure (Nintendo 3DS)
 Go! Princess Pretty Cure - Sugar Oukoku to Rokunin no Princess! (Nintendo 3DS) 
 Grand Chase (based on Grand Chase manga series)
 Guilty Crown: Lost Christmas (PC)
Gundam:
Battle Assault 3 featuring Gundam Seed (PlayStation 2)
Dynasty Warriors: Gundam (PlayStation 3, Xbox 360)
Dynasty Warriors: Gundam 2 (PlayStation 3, Xbox 360)
Dynasty Warriors: Gundam 3 (PlayStation 3, Xbox 360)
Gundam 00 (Nintendo DS, PlayStation 2)
Gundam 0079 (PlayStation)
Gundam Battle Assault (PlayStation)
Gundam Battle Assault 2 (PlayStation)
Gundam Seed: Battle Assault (GBA)
Gundam vs. Gundam (PlayStation Portable)
Gundam vs. Gundam Next Plus (PlayStation Portable)
Mobile Suit Gundam: Char's Counterattack (PlayStation)
Mobile Suit Gundam: Encounters in Space (PlayStation 2)
Mobile Suit Gundam: Federation vs. Zeon (PlayStation 2)
Mobile Suit Gundam: Journey to Jaburo (PlayStation 2)
Mobile Suit Gundam Side Story 0079: Rise from the Ashes (Sega Dreamcast)
Mobile Suit Gundam: Zeonic Front (PlayStation 2)
 Gungrave (PlayStation 2)
 Gungrave: Overdose (2004, PlayStation 2, sequel to Gungrave)

H
 Hagane no Renkinjutsushi (Game Boy Advance)
 Haikyuu!! Cross Team Match! (Nintendo 3DS)
 Haikyu!! Tsunage! Itadaki no Keshiki!! (Nintendo 3DS)
 Hajime no Ippo: The Fighting! (1997, PlayStation)
 Hajime no Ippo: Victorious Boxers (2000, PlayStation 2, Victorious Boxers: Ippo's Road to Glory)
 Hajime no Ippo: Victorious Boxers Championship Version (2002, PlayStation 2)
 Hajime no Ippo: The Fighting! (2002, Game Boy Advance)
 Hajime no Ippo: The Fighting! - All Stars (2004, PlayStation 2, Victorious Boxers 2: Fighting Spirit)
 Hajime no Ippo 2: Victorious Road (2004, PlayStation 2)
 Hajime no Ippo: Revolution (2007, Wii, Victorious Boxers: Revolutions)
 Hajime no Ippo: The Fighting! DS (2008, Nintendo DS)
 Hajime no Ippo: THE FIGHTING! Portable Victorious Spirits (PlayStation Portable)
 Hajime no Ippo: The Fighting (2014, PlayStation 3)
 Hamtaro (Game Boy Advance)
 Hana no Keiji: Kumo no Kanata ni (Super Famicom)
 Haō Taikei Ryū Knight (Super Famicom)
 Haunted Junction: Seitokai Batch o Oe! (PlayStation)
 Hayate no Gotoku (Nintendo DS, PlayStation Portable)
 Happiness Charge Pretty Cure! Kawarun☆Collection (Nintendo 3DS) 
 Heartcatch Pretty Cure! Oshare Collection (Nintendo DS)
 Hello Kitty (Famicom, Game Boy Color)
 Hetalia (Nintendo DS, PlayStation Portable)
 Hi no Tori (Family Computer, MSX2)
 Hidamari Sketch Dokodemo Sugoroku × 365 (Nintendo DS)
 Higanjima (PlayStation Portable)
 Highschool DXD: Erotic Battle Adventure Game (Nintendo 3DS) 
 Highschool! Kimen-gumi (Sega Mark III/Master System)
 Highschool! Kimen-gumi: The Table Hockey (PlayStation)
 Himiko Den
 Himouto! Umaru-chan: Umaru Training Plan (PS Vita)
 Hokuto no Ken (see List of Fist of the North Star video games)
 Honkai Impact 3rd (Android, iOS, PC)
 Honō no Dōkyūji: Dodge Danpei
 Hunter × Hunter: Ichi o Tsugomono (2000, WonderSwan)
 Hunter × Hunter: Hunter no Keifu (2000, Game Boy Color)
 Hunter × Hunter: Maraboroshi no Greed Island (2000, PlayStation)
 Hunter × Hunter: Kidan no Hihou (2001, Game Boy Color)
 Hunter × Hunter: Sorezore no Ketsui (2001, WonderSwan Color)
 Hunter × Hunter: Ubawareta Aura Stone (2001, PlayStation)
 Hunter × Hunter: Michibi Kareshi Mono (2001, WonderSwan Color)
 Hunter × Hunter: Ryumyaku no Saidan (2001, PlayStation 2)
 Hunter × Hunter: Minna Tomodachi Daisakusen (2003, Game Boy Advance)
 Hunter × Hunter: Greed Island (2003, WonderSwan Color)
 Hunter x Hunter (In Jump Super Stars) (2005, Nintendo DS)
 Hunter x Hunter (In Jump Ultimate Stars) (2006, Nintendo DS)
 Hunter x Hunter: Wonder Adventure (2012, PlayStation Portable)
 Hunter x Hunter (In J-Stars Victory VS) (2014 PlayStation 3, PlayStation Vita)

I
 Initial D Gaiden (Game Boy)
 Initial D Extreme Stage (PlayStation 3)
 Initial D: Special Stage (PlayStation 2)
 InuYasha: A Feudal Fairytale (PlayStation)
 InuYasha: Feudal Combat (PlayStation 2)
 Inuyasha: Secret of the Cursed Mask (PlayStation 2)
 Initial D: Another Stage (Game Boy Advance)
 Inuyasha: Secret of the Divine Jewel (Nintendo DS)
 Inazuma Eleven (Nintendo DS)
 Inazuma Eleven Strikers (Wii)
 Inazuma Eleven Strikers 2012 Xtreme (Wii)
 Inazuma Eleven GO Strikers 2013 (Wii)
 Initial D Arcade Stage
 Ichigeki Sacchu!! HoiHoi-san (Playstation 2)
 Iria (Super Famicom)

J
 J-Stars Victory Vs (PS3, PS Vita)
 Jankenman (Game Boy)
 Jump Super Stars (Nintendo DS)
 Jump Ultimate Stars (Nintendo DS)
 Jungle no Ōja Tar-chan: Sekai Manyū Dai Kakutō no Maki (Super Famicom)
 JoJo's Bizarre Adventure (Super Famicom)
 JoJo's Bizarre Adventure (Heritage for the Future) (Dreamcast, Playstation, Playstation 3, Xbox 360)
 JoJo's Bizarre Adventure: All Star Battle (PlayStation 3)
 JoJo's Bizarre Adventure: Eyes of Heaven (PlayStation 3, PlayStation 4)
 JoJo's Bizarre Adventure: Phantom Blood (Playstation 2)

K
 K-On! Houkago Live!! (PlayStation Portable, PlayStation 3)
 Kachō Kōsaku Shima (Super Famicom, Nintendo DS)
 Kaitou Saint Tail (Game Gear, Sega Saturn)
 Kakutō Ryōri Densetsu Bistro Recipe: Gekitō Food & Battle Hen (Game Boy Color)
 Kakutō Ryōri Densetsu Bistro Recipe: Kettō Bistogarumu Hen (Game Boy Color)
 Kakutō Ryōri Densetsu Bistro Recipe: Wonder Battle Hen (WonderSwan Color)
 Kanbutsu Himouto! Umaru-chan Daratto Puzzle (Nintendo 3DS)
 Karakuri Kengō Den Musashi Lord (Game Boy, Family Computer)
 Katte ni Shirokuma: Mori o Sukue no Maki! (Family Computer)
 Kekko Kamen (PC-98)
 Kimagure Orange Road (PC-98)
 Kimi ni Todoke: Sodateru Omoi (Nintendo DS)
 Kimi ni Todoke: Tsutaeru Kimochi (Nintendo DS)
 Kishin Douji Zenki (Game Gear)
 Kishin Douji Zenki - Battle Raiden (Super Famicom)
 Kishin Douji Zenki - Den Ei Rai Bu (Super Famicom)
 Kishin Douji Zenki - Tenchi Meidou (Super Famicom)
 Kishin Douji Zenki FX - Vajura Fight (NEC PC-FX)
 Kiteretsu Daihyakka (Family Computer, Game Boy, Super Famicom)
 Konjiki no Gash Bell
 Kōryū no Mimi (Super Famicom)
 KOU-GA-SHA ~Space Odyssey~
 Kujaku Ou  (Mark III, Mega Drive, Famicom)
 Kuroshitsuji: Phantom and Ghost (Nintendo DS)
Kyatto Ninden Teyandee (Famicom)
Kyo Kara Maoh! Oresama Quest  (PC)
Kyo Kara Maoh! Shin Makoku no Kyuujitsu  (PS2)
Kyo Kara Maoh! Hajimari no Tabi  (PS2)
Koe De Asobou - HeartCatch Pretty Cure! (Nintendo DS)

L
La Blue Girl (NEC PC-9801, FM-Towns, Windows 95)
Laid-Back Camp - Virtual - Fumoto Campsite (Android, iOS, Windows, PlayStation 4, Nintendo Switch)
Laid-Back Camp - Virtual - Lake Motosu (Android, iOS, Windows, PlayStation 4, Nintendo Switch)
Last Game
Legend of Galactic Heroes (Famicom, Super Famicom, PC-98)
Love Hina Love Hina Gorgeous (PlayStation 2, Game Boy Advance)
Lovely Idol (PlayStation 2)
Little Nemo: The Dream Master (NES)
Little Witch Academia: VR Broom Racing (Oculus Quest, HTC Vive, Valve Index, PSVR, SteamVR)
Little Witch Parfait (series)
Lucky Star (series)
Lupin III: Treasure of the Sorcerer King (PlayStation 2)
Serial: Experiments Lain (PlayStation 1)

M
 Macross (see List of Macross video games)
 Magic Knight Rayearth (Sega Pico, Sega Saturn, Game Gear, Game Boy, Super Famicom)
 Magical Hat no Buttobi Tabo! Daibōken (Mega Drive)
 Magical Taluluto (Game Boy, Family Computer, Mega Drive, Game Gear, Super Famicom)
 Mahjong Hishō-den: Naki no Ryū (Sharp X68000, PC-9801, Super Famicom)
 Mahōjin Guru Guru (Super Famicom, Game Boy, Game Boy Color)
 Mahou no Princess Minky Momo (Famicom)
 Mahou Tsukai Kurohime (Playstation 2)
 Mahou Sensei Negima (Game Boy Advance, PlayStation 2, Nintendo DS, PlayStation Portable)
 Maison Ikkoku (PC Engine)
 Marmalade Boy (Super Famicom, Game Boy)
 Martian Successor Nadesico: The Blank of Three Years (Sega Saturn)
 Martian Successor Nadesico: The Mission (Dreamcast)
 Mashin Eiyūden Wataru (PC Engine, Family Computer)
 Maya the Bee (Game Boy Advance)
 Mazinger Z (Arcade, Super Famicom)
 Medabots
 Megazone 23: Aoi Garland (PlayStation 3)
 Mermaid Melody Pichi Pichi Pitch (Game Boy Advance)
 Miracle Girls (Super Famicom)
 Miss Princess MissPuri (Nintendo DS)
 Mitsume ga Tōru
 Mitsume ga Tōru: The Three-Eyed One Comes Here (MSX, Natsume, April 1989)
 Mitsume ga Tōru (Famicom, Tomy, 1992)
 Mobile Battleship Nadesico (Sega Saturn)
 Mobile Battleship Nadesico: Ruriruri Mahjong (Game Boy Color)
 Monochrome Factor Cross Road (Japanese PS2s or PS3 only)
 Mōryō Senki MADARA (Famicom)
 Mōryō Senki MADARA 2 (Super Famicom)
 MS Saga: A New Dawn (PlayStation 2; a crossover game that featured many mobile suits and was meant to bring in new fans)
 Mugen Senshi Valis (an OVA called Genmu Senki Leda was made using the Valis games as a template, but the property itself is unrelated)
 My Hero One's Justice (PlayStation 4, Xbox One, Microsoft Windows, Nintendo Switch)
 My Hero One's Justice 2 (PlayStation 4, Xbox One, Microsoft Windows, Nintendo Switch, Google Stadia)
 MysticLegend

N
 Nagagutsu o Haita Neko: Sekai Isshū 80 Nichi Dai Bōken (Family Computer)
 Nakayoshi All-Stars: Mezase! Gakuen Idol! (Nintendo DS)
 Nanatsu no Taizai: Knights of Britannia (PlayStation 4, 2018)
 Nanatsu no Taizai: Unjust Sin (Nintendo 3DS, 2015)
 Nana (PlayStation 2)
 Nana: Everything Is Controlled By The Great Demon King!? (PlayStation Portable)
 Nana: Live Staff Mass Recruiting! Beginners Welcome (Nintendo DS)
 Nangoku Shōnen Papuwa-kun (Game Boy, Super Famicom)
 Nari Kids Park: HUGtto! Pretty Cure (Nintendo Switch)
 Naruto: The Broken Bond (Xbox 360)
 Naruto: Clash of Ninja (Nintendo GameCube)
 Naruto: Clash of Ninja 2 (Nintendo GameCube)
 Naruto: Clash of Ninja Revolution (Wii)
 Naruto: Clash of Ninja Revolution 2 (Wii)
 Naruto: Gekitō Ninja Taisen! 3 (Nintendo GameCube)
 Naruto: Gekitō Ninja Taisen! 4 (Nintendo GameCube)
 Naruto: Konoha Ninpouchou (WonderSwan Color)
 Naruto: Konoha Senki (Game Boy Advance)
 Naruto: Ninja Council (Game Boy Advance)
 Naruto: Ninja Council 2 (Game Boy Advance)
 Naruto: Ninja Council 3 (Nintendo DS)
 Naruto: Path of the Ninja (Naruto RPG: Uketsugareshi Hi no Ishi) (Nintendo DS)
 Naruto: Path of the Ninja 2 (Naruto RPG 3: Reijū vs. Konoha Shōtai) (Nintendo DS)
 Naruto: Rise of a Ninja (Xbox 360)
 Naruto: Shinobi no Sato no Jintori Kassen (PlayStation)
 Naruto: Ultimate Ninja (PlayStation 2, PlayStation portable)
 Naruto: Ultimate Ninja 2 (PlayStation 2, PlayStation portable)
 Naruto: Ultimate Ninja 3 (PlayStation 2, PlayStation portable)
 Naruto: Ultimate Ninja Storm (PlayStation 3)
 Naruto: Uzumaki Chronicles (PlayStation 2)
 Naruto: Uzumaki Chronicles 2 (PlayStation 2)
 Naruto Shippūden: Clash of Ninja Revolution 3 (Wii)
 Naruto Shippūden: Gekitō Ninja Taisen! EX (Wii)
 Naruto Shippūden: Gekitō Ninja Taisen! EX 2 (Wii)
 Naruto Shippūden: Gekitō Ninja Taisen! EX 3 (Wii)
 Naruto Shippūden: Gekitō Ninja Taisen! Special (Wii)
 Naruto Shippūden: Legends: Akatsuki Rising (PlayStation Portable)
 Naruto Shippuden: Naruto vs. Sasuke (Nintendo DS)
 Naruto Shippūden: Ninja Council 4 (Nintendo DS)
 Naruto Shippuden: Shinobi Rumble (Nintendo DS)
 Naruto Shippūden: Ultimate Ninja 4 (Naruto Shippūden: Narutimate Accel) (PlayStation 2)
 Naruto Shippūden: Ultimate Ninja 5 (Naruto Shippūden: Narutimate Accel 2) (PlayStation 2)
 Naruto Shippuden: Ultimate Ninja Impact (PlayStation Portable)
 Naruto Shippuden: Ultimate Ninja Storm 2 (PlayStation 3), (Xbox 360)
 Naruto Shippuden: Ultimate Ninja Storm 3 (PlayStation 3), (Xbox 360), (PC)
 Naruto Shippuden: Ultimate Ninja Storm 4 (Xbox One), (PlayStation 4), (PC)
 Naruto Shippuden: Ultimate Ninja Storm Generations (PlayStation 3), (Xbox 360) 
 Naruto Shippuden: Ultimate Ninja Storm Revolution (PlayStation 3), (Xbox 360), (PC)
 Natsuki Crisis Battle (Super Famicom)
 Neon Genesis Evangelion: Neon Genesis Evangelion 64 (Nintendo 64, 1999)
 Neon Genesis Evangelion: Ayanami Raising Project (PC, Dreamcast, PlayStation 2, Nintendo DS)
 Neon Genesis Evangelion: Neon Genesis Evangelion 2 (PlayStation 2, 2004)
 Neon Genesis Evangelion: Shinji Ikari Raising Project (Windows, 2004)
 Neon Genesis Evangelion: The Secret of Evangelion (PlayStation 2, 2006)
 Neon Genesis Evangelion: Meitantei Evangelion (PlayStation 2, 2007)
 Neon Genesis Evangelion: Battle Orchestra  (PlayStation 2, 2008)
 Neon Genesis Evangelion: Evangelion: Jo (PlayStation 2, 2009)
 New Mobile Report Gundam Wing: Endless Duel (Super Famicom)
 Nichijou: Uchuujin (PlayStation Portable)
 Ninja Hattori-kun (Family Computer)
 Nintama Rantarō (Game Boy, Game Boy Color, Super Famicom, Windows, Playdia, Sega Pico, Nintendo 64, Nintendo DS)

O
Ojomajo Doremi (Sega Pico, PlayStation, 
Obake no Q-tarō: WanWan Panic (Family Computer)
Oishinbo (Family Computer, Nintendo DS)
One Piece (Game Boy Advance)
One Piece: Gear Spirits (Nintendo DS)
One Piece Grand Adventure (PlayStation 2, GameCube)
One Piece Grand Battle! (PlayStation 2, PSone, GameCube)
One Piece Grand Battle 3 (PlayStation 2, GameCube)
One Piece: Pirate Warriors (PlayStation 3)
One Piece: Pirates Carnival (PlayStation 2, GameCube)
One Piece: Pirate Warriors 2 (PS3, PS Vita)
One Piece Treasure Battle! (GameCube)
One Piece: Unlimited Adventure (Wii)
One Piece: Unlimited Cruise: The Treasure Beneath the Waves (Wii)
One Piece: Unlimited Cruise 2: Awakening of a Hero (Wii)
One Piece: Pirate Warriors 3
One Piece: Unlimited World Red
One Piece: Burning Blood
One Piece: World Seeker
One Piece: Pirate Warriors 4
Ookiku Furikabutte - Honto no Ace ni Nareru kamo (Nintendo DS)
Ore no Imouto ga Konnani Kawaii Wake ga Nai. HappyenD (PlayStation 3)
Ore no Imouto ga Konna ni Kawaii Wake ga Nai Portable (PlayStation Portable)
Ore no Imouto ga Konnani Kawaii Wake ga Nai Portable ga Tsuzuku Wake ga Nai (PlayStation Portable)
Ore no Imouto Maker EX (PlayStation Portable)
Osomatsu-kun: Hachamecha Gekijō (Mega Drive)
Osu!! Karate Bu (Super Famicom)
Ouran Koukou Host Club (PlayStation 2; Japan only)
Ouran Koukou Host Club DS (Nintendo DS; Japan only)

P
 Parasol Henbee (Game Boy, Family Computer)
 Patlabor (Famicom Disk System, Game Boy, Mega Drive, Turbo CD, PlayStation, PlayStation Portable)
Perman (Famicom)
The Pet Girl of Sakurasou(PSP)
Pokonyan! (Game Boy, Super Famicom)
Pretty Cure All Stars Everyone Gather ☆ Let's Dance! (Wii)
Pretty Cure Connection Puzzlun
Pretty Cure Online
Pretty Soldier Sailor Moon (Arcade)
The Prince of Tennis - Driving Smash! Side Genius (Nintendo DS)
The Prince of Tennis - Driving Smash! Side King (Nintendo DS)
 Princess Princess: Hime-tachi no Abunai Hōkago (PlayStation 2)
 Project Arms in Europe(Germany) only Arms (PlayStation 2)
 Puella Magi Madoka Magica Portable (PlayStation Portable; Japan only)
 Puella Magi Madoka Magica: The Battle Pentagram (PS Vita)
 Puss 'n Boots: Pero's Great Adventure NES

Q
 The Quiz Master

R
 R: Rock'n Riders (PlayStation)
 Raki Suta Moe Doriru
 Ranma 1/2 (Super Famicom, PlayStation, Game Boy, PC 98, Mega CD)
 Rave Master (GameCube)
 Rave Master: Special Attack Force! (Game Boy Advance)
 Really? Really! (PC, Nintendo DS)
 Re:Zero − Starting Life in Another World: Death or Kiss (PS Vita, PlayStation 4)
 Re:Zero − Starting Life in Another World: The Prophecy of the Throne (Windows, PlayStation 4, Nintendo Switch)
 Rebuild of Evangelion Sound Impact (PlayStation Portable)
 Ring ni Kakero (Super Famicom)
 Ro-Kyu-Bu! Naisho no Shutter Chance (PS Vita)
 Rokudenashi Blues (Family Computer, Super Famicom)
 Rosario + Vampire Capu2: Koi to Yume no Rhapsodia (PlayStation 2)
 Rosario + Vampire: Tanabata no Miss Yōkai Gakuen (Nintendo DS)
 Rozen Maiden: ALiBAT (freeware game for PC)
 Rozen Maiden: Duellwalzer (PlayStation 2)
 Rozen Maiden: Gebetgarten (PlayStation 2)
 Rurouni Kenshin: Enjō! Kyoto Rinne (PlayStation 2)
 Rurouni Kenshin: Meiji Kenkaku Roman Tan Saisen (PlayStation Portable)
 Rurouni Kenshin: Meiji Kenyaku Romantan (PlayStation)
 RWBY: Grimm Eclipse (PlayStation 4, Xbox One Microsoft Windows, macOS)
 RWBY: Crystal Match (Android, iOS)
 RWBY: Amity Arena (Android)
 RWBY Deckbuilding Game (Android, Microsoft Windows)
 RWBY (mobile game) (iOS, Android, PC)

S
Saikano (PlayStation 2)
Sailor Moon (see List of Sailor Moon video games)
Saint Seiya
Sakigake!! Otokojuku (Game Boy, Family Computer, PlayStation, PlayStation 2)
Samurai 7 (PlayStation 2)
Samurai Champloo (PlayStation 2)
Samurai Deeper Kyo (GBA)
Scarlet Nexus (Windows, PlayStation 4, PlayStation 5, Xbox One, Xbox Series X, Xbox Series S; released alongside the anime series.)
School Rumble: 2nd Semester – Summer Training Camp (of fear?)!! Ghost's Appearing in the Western-styled Building!? Fighting Over the Treasure!!! (PlayStation 2)
School Rumble: Sis This is Serious! (PlayStation Portable)
School Rumble: Sleep Helps a Girl Grow (PlayStation 2)
Science Ninja Team Gatchaman (Atari ST, Amiga, Amstrad CPC, Commodore 64, ZX Spectrum, PC-98, PlayStation, PlayStation 2)
Serial Experiments Lain (video game) (PlayStation)
Shaman King Cho-Senjiryakketsu 2 (Game Boy Advance)
Shaman King Cho-Senjiryakketsu 3 (Game Boy Advance)
Shaman King Cho-Senjiryakketsu: Funbari Version (Game Boy Color)
Shaman King Cho-Senjiryakketsu: Meramera Version (Game Boy Color)
Shaman King: Funbari Spirits (PlayStation 2)
Shaman King: Legacy of the Spirits - Soaring Hawk (Game Boy Advance)
Shaman King: Legacy of the Spirits - Sprinting Wolf (Game Boy Advance)
Shaman King: Master of Spirits (Game Boy Advance)
Shaman King: Master of Spirits 2 (Game Boy Advance)
Shaman King: Power of Spirit (PlayStation 2)
Shaman King: Soul Fight (Nintendo GameCube)
Shaman King: Spirit of Shamans (PlayStation)
Shaman King: Will to the Future (WonderSwan Color)
Shijou Saikyou no Deshi Kenichi (PlayStation 2)
Shin Lucky Star Moe Drill
Shin Lucky Star Moe Drill Tabidachi
Shogo: Mobile Armor Division (PC)
Shojo Kakumei Utena (Sega Saturn)
Shokuhoko no Soma - Yuujou to Kizuna no Hitosara (Nintendo 3DS)
Shoukoushi Cedie (Family Computer)
Shugo Chara! Three Eggs and the Joker in Love! (Nintendo DS)
Shugo Chara! Amu's Rainbow-Colored Chara Change! (Nintendo DS)
Shugo Chara! Norinori! Chara Formation-Rhythm (Nintendo DS)
Skip Beat (PlayStation 2)
Slam Dunk (Super Famicom, Sega Saturn, iOS)
Slayers (Super Famicom)
Slayers Royal (Sega Saturn)
Slayers Royal 2 (Sega Saturn)
Soar High! Isami
Sonic X (Leapster)
Sonic Soldier Borgman (Sega Mark III/Master System)
Sora no Otoshimono Forte: Dreamy Season (Nintendo DS)
Sotsugyo and Sotsugyou M
Soul Eater: Battle Resonance (PlayStation 2, PlayStation Portable)
Soul Eater: Monotone Princess (Wii)
Soul Eater: Plot of Medusa (Nintendo DS)
Spice and Wolf VR (Windows, PlayStation 4, Nintendo Switch, Oculus Go, Oculus Quest)
Spice&Wolf VR2 (Windows, PlayStation 4, Nintendo Switch, Oculus Go, Oculus Quest)
Spriggan: Lunar Verse (PlayStation)
Super Bikkuriman (Super Famicom)
Super Doll Licca-chan (Game Boy Color)
Super GALS! Kotobuki Ran (Game Boy Color)
Super GALS! Kotobuki Ran 2 ~Miracle -> Getting~ (Game Boy Color)
Super GALS! Kotobuki Ran Special -> Coolmen Get you Gals Party -> (PlayStation)
Sutobasu Yarō Shō (Super Famicom)
Episode 1: Suki na Mono wa Suki Dakara Shouganai!! -FIRST LIMIT- (PC, PlayStation 2)
Episode 2: Suki na Mono wa Suki Dakara Shouganai!! -TARGET NIGHTS- (PC, PlayStation 2)
Episode 3: Suki na Mono wa Suki Dakara Shouganai!! -RAIN- (PC, PlayStation 2)
Episode 4: Suki na Mono wa Suki Dakara Shouganai!! +White Flower+ (PC)
Sword Art Online Alicization Rising Steel (Android, iOS)
Sword Art Online: Fatal Bullet (Windows, Xbox One, PlayStation4, Nintendo Switch)
Sword Art Online: Hollow Fragment (PS Vita, PS4)
Sword Art Online: Infinity Moment (PlayStation Portable)
Sword Art Online: Integral Factor (Android, iOS)
Sword Art Online: Lost Song (PS3, PS Vita)
SWORD ART ONLINE:Memory Defrag (Android, iOS)
Sword of the Berserk: Guts' Rage (Sega Dreamcast)
Smile Pretty Cure! Let's Go! Märchen World (Nintendo 3DS)
Suite Pretty Cure: Melody Collection (Nintendo DS)

T
Takahashi Meijin no Bug-tte Honey (Famicom, Hudson Soft, June 5, 1987)
Teasing Master Takagi-san VR - 1st Semester (Oculus Quest, HTC Vive, Valve Index)
Teasing Master Takagi-san VR - 2nd Semester (Oculus Quest, HTC Vive, Valve Index)
Tekkaman Blade (Game Boy, Super Famicom, NEC PC-9801)
Tekken Tag Tournament Two (Xbox 360, PlayStation 3)
Tenchi Muyo! Game-Hen (Super Famicom)
Tenchi Muyo! Toukou Muyou (PlayStation, Sega Saturn)
Tengen Toppa Gurren Lagann
Tennis no Oujisama 2005 Crystal Drive (Nintendo DS)
Tennis no Oujisama: Boys Be Glorious (Nintendo DS)
Tennis no Oujisama: Girls Be Gracious (Nintendo DS)
Tennis no Oujisama: Smash Hits (PlayStation 2)
Tennis no Oujisama: Smash Hits 2 (PlayStation 2)
Tensai Bakabon (Sega Mark III/Master System)
Terrorist Invasion (PlayStation 3, PlayStation 2)
 Tetsuwan Atom (Famicom, Konami, February 26, 1988)
 Tetsuwan Atom (Super Famicom, Banpresto, February 18, 1994)
Tick! Tack! (PC)
Toaru Majutsu no Index (PlayStation Portable)
To Love-Ru Darkness: Battle Ecstasy (PS Vita)
Tokyo Mew Mew (Game Boy Advance, PlayStation)
Top Striker (Family Computer)
Toradora! Portable (PlayStation Portable)
Tottemo! Luckyman: Everyone Loves Lucky Cookie!! (Game Boy)
Tottemo! Luckyman: Lucky Cookie Roulette Assault!! (Super Famicom)
Trigun: The Planet Gunsmoke
Tsubasa Chronicle (Nintendo DS)

U
 U.N. Squadron, see Area 88
 Uchuu no Stellvia (PlayStation 2, Game Boy Advance)
 Ultraman (Super Famicom, Mega Drive)
 Ueki no Hōsoku (PlayStation 2, Game Boy Advance)
 Urotsukidoji (PC98)
 Urusei Yatsura (MSX2, Game Boy, Mega CD)
 Ushio and Tora (Famicom, Super Famicom)
 Utsurun Desu.: Kawauso Hawaii e Iku!!! (Family Computer)

V
Vampire Hunter D (PlayStation)
Vampire Knight (DS)
Venus Wars (Famicom)
Victorious Boxers 2 - Fighting Spirit (PlayStation 2)
Victorious Boxers - Ippo's Road to Glory (PlayStation 2)
Victorious Boxers: Revolution (Wii)
Violinist of Hameln (Super Famicom)

W
 W Wish
 Wagamama Fairy Mirumo de Pon! (Game Boy Advance)
 Wangan Midnight (Arcade, PS2, PS3)
 Wedding Peach (Super Famicom, Game Boy, PC-98)
 Wedding Peach: Doki Doki Oiro-naoshi Fashion Dai-sakusen (PlayStation)
 World Trigger: Borderless Mission (PlayStation Vita)

X
 X: Card of Fate (WonderSwan Color)
 X: Unmei no Sentaku (PlayStation)

Y
Yadamon (Super Famicom)
Yes! Pretty Cure 5 (Nintendo DS)
Yes! Pretty Cure 5 GoGo! - Zenin ShūGo! Dream Festival (Nintendo DS)
Youchien Senki MADARA (Super Famicom)
Yu-Gi-Oh! 5D's: Decade Duels (Xbox 360, PlayStation 3)
Yu-Gi-Oh! 5D's: Master of the Cards (Wii)
Yu-Gi-Oh! 5D's Mobile (i-mode, EZweb, Yahoo! Mobile)
Yu-Gi-Oh! 5D's Stardust Accelerator: WORLD CHAMPIONSHIP 2009 (Nintendo DS)
Yu-Gi-Oh! 5D's: Tag Force 4 (PlayStation Portable)
Yu-Gi-Oh! 5D's: Tag Force 5 (PlayStation Portable)
Yu-Gi-Oh! 5D's: Tag Force 6 (PlayStation Portable)
Yu-Gi-Oh! 5D's: Wheelie Breakers (Wii)
Yu-Gi-Oh! 5D's WORLD CHAMPIONSHIP 2010: Reverse of Arcadia (Nintendo DS)
Yu-Gi-Oh! 5D's WORLD CHAMPIONSHIP 2011: Over the Nexus (Nintendo DS)
Yu-Gi-Oh! Arc-V Tag Force Special (PlayStation Portable)
Yu-Gi-Oh! Capsule Monsters Coliseum (PlayStation 2)
Yu-Gi-Oh! The Dawn of Destiny (Xbox)
Yu-Gi-Oh! Duel Arena (PC)
Yu-Gi-Oh! Duel Monsters (Game Boy)
Yu-Gi-Oh! Duel Monsters 4: Battle of the Powerful Duelists (Game Boy Color)
Yu-Gi-Oh! Duel Monsters 5: Expert 1 (Game Boy Advance)
Yu-Gi-Oh! Duel Monsters 6: Expert 2 (Game Boy Advance)
Yu-Gi-Oh! Duel Monsters 7: The Duelcity Legend (Game Boy Advance)
Yu-Gi-Oh! Duel Monsters 8: Great False God of Destruction (Game Boy Advance)
Yu-Gi-Oh! Duel Monsters Expert 2006 (Game Boy Advance)
Yu-Gi-Oh! Duel Monsters Expert 3 (Game Boy Advance)
Yu-Gi-Oh! Duel Monsters GX: Aim to be Duel King! (Game Boy Advance)
Yu-Gi-Oh! Duel Monsters GX: Card Almanac (Nintendo DS)
Yu-Gi-Oh! Duel Monsters GX: Spirit Summoner (Nintendo DS)
Yu-Gi-Oh! Duel Monsters GX: Tag Force (PlayStation Portable)
Yu-Gi-Oh! Duel Monsters GX: Tag Force 2 (PlayStation Portable)
Yu-Gi-Oh! Duel Monsters GX: Tag Force Evolution (PlayStation 2)
Yu-Gi-Oh! Duel Monsters II: Dark Duel Stories (Game Boy Color)
Yu-Gi-Oh! Duel Monsters III: Tri-Holy God Event (Game Boy Color)
Yu-Gi-Oh! Duel Monsters International 2 (Game Boy Advance)
Yu-Gi-Oh! Duel Monsters: Nightmare Troubadour (Nintendo DS)
Yu-Gi-Oh! Duel Monsters WORLD CHAMPIONSHIP 2007 (Nintendo DS)
Yu-Gi-Oh! Duel Monsters WORLD CHAMPIONSHIP 2008 (Nintendo DS)
Yu-Gi-Oh! Dungeon Dice Monsters (Game Boy Advance)
Yu-Gi-Oh! Falsebound Kingdom: The Confined Imaginary Kingdom (Nintendo GameCube)
Yu-Gi-Oh! Millennium Duels (Xbox 360, PlayStation 3)
Yu-Gi-Oh! Monster Capsule: Breed & Battle (PlayStation)
Yu-Gi-Oh! Monster Capsule GB (Game Boy Color)
Yu-Gi-Oh! ONLINE (PC)
Yu-Gi-Oh! ONLINE DUEL ACCELERATOR (PC)
Yu-Gi-Oh! ONLINE DUEL EVOLUTION (PC)
Yu-Gi-Oh! Power of Chaos: Joey the Passion (PC)
Yu-Gi-Oh! Power of Chaos: Kaiba the Revenge (PC)
Yu-Gi-Oh! Power of Chaos: Yugi the Destiny (PC)
Yu-Gi-Oh! Sugoroku's Board Game (Game Boy Advance)
Yu-Gi-Oh! True Duel Monsters II: Inherited Memories (PlayStation 2)
Yu-Gi-Oh! True Duel Monsters: Sealed Memories (PlayStation)
Yu-Gi-Oh! Worldwide Edition: Stairway to the destined duel (Game Boy Advance)
Yu-Gi-Oh! ZeXal: Clash! Duel Carnival! (Nintendo 3DS)
The Battle of Yu Yu Hakusho: Shitō! Ankoku Bujutsu Kai (Arcade and PlayStation 2)
Yu Yu Hakusho (Super Famicom, Game Boy, 3DO)
Yu Yu Hakusho 2: Kakutou no Sho (Super Famicom)
Yu Yu Hakusho: Bakutō Ankoku Bujutsu Kai (Famicom)
Yu Yu Hakusho Dai-Ni-Dan: Ankoku Bujutsu Kai Hen (Game Boy)
Yu Yu Hakusho Dai-San-Dan: Makai no Tobira (Game Boy)
Yu Yu Hakusho Dai-Yon-Dan: Makai Tōitsu Hen (Game Boy)
Yu Yu Hakusho: Dark Tournament (PlayStation 2)
Yu Yu Hakusho DS: Ankoku Bujutsu Kai Hen (Nintendo DS)
Yu Yu Hakusho Final (Super Famicom)
Yu Yu Hakusho Forever (PlayStation 2)
Yu Yu Hakusho Gaiden MD (Mega Drive)
Yu Yu Hakusho: Horobishi Mono no Gyakushū (Game Gear)
Yu Yu Hakusho II: Gekitou! Shichi Kyō no Tatakai (Game Gear)
Yu Yu Hakusho: Makyō Tōitsusen (Mega Drive)
Yu Yu Hakusho: Spirit Detective (Game Boy Advance)
Yu Yu Hakusho: Tokubetsu Hen (Super Famicom)
Yu Yu Hakusho: Tournament Tactics (Game Boy Advance)
Yu Yu Hakusho: Yamishōbu! Ankoku Bujutsu Kai (PC Engine)

Z
 Zatch Bell! series
 Zatch Bell! Electric Arena (Game Boy Advance)
 Zatch Bell! Mamodo Battles (Nintendo GameGube and PlayStation 2)
 Zatch Bell! Mamodo Fury  (Nintendo GameGube and PlayStation 2)
 Zero no Tsukaima: Muma ga Tsumugu Yokaze no Nocturne  (PlayStation 2)
 Zillion  (Master System)
 Zoids (List of Zoids Video Games)
 Zoids: Battle Legends (GameCube)

Release timeline

See also 
 List of anime based on video games
 List of hentai computer games
 List of video games based on comics
 List of video games based on cartoons

References

Video games based on anime or manga, List of
List
List